Podocarpus nivalis, the mountain or snow tōtara, is a species of conifer in the family Podocarpaceae. It is endemic to New Zealand.

Name and etymology 
Podocarpus nivalis was first described and drawn by W.J. Hooker in 1843 in his Icones Plantarum. The plant described was found on Mount Tongariro, on the North Island of New Zealand, by William Colenso, "near the limits of perpetual snow".

The species name "nivalis" means "growing in or near the snow." A vernacular name for the plant is "alpine tōtara".

Description
Podocarpus nivalis grows as a shrub of 20-40 cm. with spreading branches. It can also be semi-erect and up to 2 or 3m tall. Branches that contact the soil often root. It forms mats of a few square metres.

Leaves are thick, rigid and close together. They are arranged spirally and are a brownish green colour when they age. The leaves are 3-10 mm long and 2-2,5 mm wide and boat-shaped (naviculate) to ovate-linear. They may be curved outwards or down. The leaves are obtuse or mucronate at the apex.

Distribution
This species is found in the North Island south of Mt Hikurangi and Mt Pirongia and in the South Island.

Cultivation and uses
It is one of the hardiest podocarps of the Southern Hemisphere, it has withstood minus 25 °C (minus 13 °F) in the British Isles, and survives long periods under snow in its native habitat, close to the tree line in NZ's high mountains. It needs high rainfall to grow well.

References

Sources

Further reading
Allan. H.H. 1961. Flora of New Zealand. Government Printer, Wellington.
Bean. W. Trees and Shrubs Hardy in Great Britain. Vol 1 - 4 and Supplement. Murray 1981
Huxley. A. 1992. The New RHS Dictionary of Gardening. MacMillan Press 1992 

Trees of New Zealand
nivalis
Trees of mild maritime climate
Ornamental trees
Least concern plants
Taxonomy articles created by Polbot